Armando Salvietti (born 10 January 1955) is a Bolivian former sports shooter. He competed in the trap and skeet events at the 1972 Summer Olympics.

References

1955 births
Living people
Bolivian male sport shooters
Olympic shooters of Bolivia
Shooters at the 1972 Summer Olympics
Place of birth missing (living people)